Black Dome is the second highest point on the west end of the Tank Mountains, located in the northwestern Sonoran Desert in northeastern Yuma County, Arizona and  east northeast of the city of Yuma.

The western two-thirds of the Tank Mountains, including Black Dome, are located in the Kofa National Wildlife Refuge which is managed by the U.S. Fish and Wildlife Service. The east–west trending Tank Mountains lie next to the Kofa Mountains to the northwest.

See also
 Kofa National Wildlife Refuge

References

External links
 
 

Mountain ranges of Yuma County, Arizona
Protected areas of the Sonoran Desert
Mountain ranges of the Sonoran Desert
Mountains of Yuma County, Arizona